Bangladesh will compete in the first ever South Asian Winter Games in Dehradun and Auli, India. Bangladesh will send 2 athletes, and will compete in a winter sport competition for the first time. Bangladesh will also send one official.

Speed skating
Men
Imran Hossain Emon
Smith Savio Gomez

References

South Asian Winter Games, 2011
2011 South Asian Winter Games
South Asian Winter Games
Bangladesh at the South Asian Games